Chelsea Cullen is an Australian pop singer. Cullen provided the singing voice of Helen Reddy in the 2019 biographical film, I Am Woman, for which she won an ARIA Music Award.

Discography

Soundtracks

Extended plays

Singles

Awards and nominations

ARIA Music Awards
The ARIA Music Awards is an annual awards ceremony that recognises excellence, innovation, and achievement across all genres of Australian music. Cullen has received 1 nomination.

|-
| 2020  
| I Am Woman (Original Soundtrack)
| Best Original Soundtrack or Musical Theatre Cast Album 
| 
|-

References

Australian singer-songwriters
Living people
1994 births
ARIA Award winners
21st-century Australian women singers
Australian indie pop musicians
Australian women singer-songwriters
Musicians from Perth, Western Australia